Roots and Branches may refer to:

 Roots and Branches (The Dillards album), 1972 album by The Dillards
 Roots and Branches (Robin Trower album), 2013 album by Robin Trower
 Roots and Branches (2001 film), 2001 film directed by Yu Zhong
 Roots and Branches, a 2007 book of essays by the Tolkien scholar Tom Shippey